Robo is a 2019 Russian children's adventure film directed by Sarik Andreasyan and screenwriters Aleksey Gravitskiy and Sergey Volkov will tell about a boy and a robot with whom he managed to make friends, starring Daniil Muravyov-Izotov and Sergey Bezrukov as the voice of Robo. The film released on October 31, 2019, by Central Partnership.

Plot 
Mitya Privalov is twelve years old, and his only and perhaps the most powerful dream is to draw comics. Naturally, as everyone already knows, superheroes who have superpowers prevail here. The only problem is that the parents do not understand the attraction of the youth. The parents of the child themselves, work in the field of robotics, and dream of the fact that someday their son will follow in their footsteps. Taking into account that Mitya is still a youth and needs support, only his parents do not give him this support. But the guy could never even think about the fact that the robot could support him, and he would do it, would become his best friend and mentor. With a new hero named Robo, Mitya met unexpectedly under strange circumstances. As it turned out, the parents of Mitya, created this iron miracle, and had the marking A-112. But the engineers didn’t like something in the workshop where it was created, and they decided to write off the robot, only now Mitya does not want to give it away, and constantly protects it from everyone and hides it. From now on, this fun and friendly couple will have a bunch of adventures together, of which there will be dangerous ones. But still, the human dream is perhaps the most powerful force on this planet, and with its help a person can do anything.

Cast 
 Daniil Muravyev-Izotov as Dmitriy "Mitya" Privalov
 Sergey Bezrukov as Robo, (voice)
 Vladimir Vdovichenkov as Viktor Privalov
 Mariya Mironova as Nadezhda "Nadya" Privalova
 Konstantin Lavronenko as general
 Hrant Tokhatyan as uncle Kolya
 Elizabeth Moryak as Katya
  as physical education teacher

Production
The kind family film directed by Sarik Andreasyan combines decent graphics with a sincere acting. Young Daniil Muravyev-Izotov starred in the company of such famous artists as Vladimir Vdovichenkov. A funny and cute Robo speaks in the voice of Sergey Bezrukov, more precisely - in several of his voices.

It’s easy to notice the sources of inspiration used by the creators of the film Robo. The design of the title character makes him very similar to Bumblebee - one of the main characters in the Transformers franchise.

Release 
The premiere date in Russia is due to take place in cinemas in the country on October 31, 2019 by the distributor acts as a Central Partnership.

References

External links 
 

2019 films
2010s Russian-language films
2010s children's adventure films
Russian children's adventure films
Robot films
Films set in Moscow
Films set in Russia